William Price, Will Price, Bill Price, or Billy Price may refer to:

Business
 William Price (merchant) (1789–1867), Canadian lumber merchant and manufacturer of planks
 William Philip Price (1817–1891), British merchant, magistrate and politician
 William Evan Price (1827–1880), Quebec businessman and political figure
 William Price (industrialist) (1860–1938), Welsh farmer and industrialist
 William G. Price Jr. (1869–1960), American businessman and Army general
 William S. Price III, known as Bill Price, co-founder of private equity firm the Texas Pacific Group
 William H. Price, co-founder of Chandler & Price

Entertainment
 Bill Price (record producer) (1944–2016), producer and engineer
 Billy Price (singer) (born 1949), American soul singer
 Billy Price (actor) (born 2000), English actor

Politics
 William Price (MP for Bath) (died 1596), British member of Parliament
 William Price (of Briton Ferry), Welsh politician in the House of Commons (1614–1626)
 William Price (Royalist) (1619–1691), British MP for Merioneth
 William Price (High Sheriff) (1690–1774), High Sheriff of two Welsh counties in the 1730s
 William C. Price (1816–1901), Treasurer of the United States (1860–1861)
 William T. Price (1824–1886), U.S. Representative from Wisconsin
 William P. Price (1835–1908), U.S. Representative from Georgia
 William Edwin Price (1841–1886), British member of Parliament for Tewkesbury (1868–1880)
 William Price (Canadian politician) (1867–1924)
 William Price (Australian politician) (1869–1937)
 William Herbert Price (1877–1963), Attorney General of Ontario (1926–1934)
 William Price (Labour politician) (1934–1999), British Labour MP for Rugby (1966–1979)
 Bill Price (politician) (born 1935), Queensland Legislative Assemblyman
 William Price, British member of Parliament for Beaumaris (1558–1567)
 William M. Price, politician and United States Attorney for the Southern District of New York (1834–1838)
 William Jennings Price (1873–1922), Ambassador of the United States to Panama (1913–1921)
 William B. Price, Nebraska State Auditor (1933–1935)
 William H. Price, Nebraska State Auditor (1937–1939)

Sports
 William Price (Liverpool and District cricketer) (1859–?), English cricketer
 Bill Price (baseball) (1863–1922), Philadelphia Athletics 1890
 Bill Price (cricketer) (1881–1958), English cricketer
 William Price (Worcestershire cricketer) (1900–1982), English cricketer
 William Price (footballer) (1903–1987), Indian-born English footballer
 William Price (table tennis) (1915–?), American table tennis player
 Billy Price (footballer, born 1917) (1917–1995), English footballer
 Bill Price (curler) (born 1928), Canadian curler
 Billy Price (footballer, born 1934) (1934–2004), Scottish footballer
 William Price (volleyball) (born 1987), American volleyball player
 Billy Price (American football) (born 1995), American football player

Other
 William Price (orientalist) (1780–1830), English linguist
 William Price (physician) (1800–1893), Welsh physician
 William Lightfoot Price (1861–1916), American architect
 William Wallace Price (1867–1931), American journalist
 William Price (RAF officer) (1895–1982), British World War I flying ace
 Bill Price (physicist) (1909–1993), Welsh infrared spectroscopist
 William A. Price (1915–2009), reporter for the New York Daily News (1940–1955)
 William Ray Price Jr. (born 1952), Chief Justice of the Supreme Court of Missouri
 William Archer Price, photographer